The Reverend Norman McCay is a fictional character from the DC Comics mini-series Kingdom Come, where he acted as the narrator and de facto protagonist.  As Kingdom Come is an Elseworlds series, McCay has not been seen in the regular DC Universe continuity since. However, with the recent revelations in the Justice Society of America title, McCay is apparently a part of DC Comics' multiverse. McCay is a preacher and the witness to the Biblical events of the series.

Publication history
Norman McCay was created by Alex Ross and Mark Waid for the Kingdom Come miniseries, wherein he narrated the events of the story. United Church of Christ minister Clark Ross, father of artist Alex Ross, posed for Norman McCay. The sweater McCay wears throughout the series is based on that of the elder Ross (as mentioned by Alex in the sketchbook section of the Kingdom Come Trade Paperback).

The surname "McCay" is a homage to cartoonist Winsor McCay, creator of Little Nemo comics.

Fictional character biography
McCay is a Dutch Reformed minister. He was friend and pastor to the former Sandman, Wesley Dodds, until he died. Dodds proclaimed an apocalyptic prophecy concerning future events involving the world's super-heroes. Prior to entering the presence of the Quintessence he had always believed that God was a force and that that force did not assume a literal physical form or create servants to its will.

McCay is saddened by this and finds that he has inherited Dodds' visions. McCay's world is one where a new generation of super-heroes has become far more violent and bloodthirsty than their predecessors — such as Superman, Batman and Wonder Woman. This culminates in the destruction of Kansas in a battle resulting in the deaths of one million people.

As upset as anyone else, McCay later delivers a sermon based on the Book of Revelation which includes passages that unintentionally reminds his congregation of the Kansas disaster. This drives them away and a frustrated McCay is then contacted by the Spectre to bear witness to the events of the changing world. He believes the Spectre to be an angel and thus validates his faith.

In the course of their travels, McCay and the Spectre witness the growing tension in the world, the attempts by Superman and his Justice League to restore order and plots by the likes of Lex Luthor to take advantage in order to seize power for themselves.

While invisible to most, McCay becomes visible to the Justice League on one occasion when the Flash grabs him from the dimension through which he travels. He attempts to tell Superman that the apocalypse will result from their actions. Superman, however, is confused by his appearance and refuses his warning in part because, knowing he is trapped, McCay delivers the warning in the form of repeating a biblical passage spoken to him by Dodds.

At the final battle involving the Outsiders, the Justice League and the heroes who escaped from the super-hero gulag, a nuclear bomb is dropped by the U.N. The Spectre asks McCay to pass judgement on who is right. McCay, recognizing that the situation is more complex than simply a right or wrong decision, sees an alternative.

After the bomb detonates, McCay grows angry at the Spectre's announced intent to depart and leave things as they are. He informs him that if Superman went to the U.N. and events proceed this would allow the very evil that the Spectre is supposed to oppose. As Superman rages at the U.N., McCay reaches him and informs him of the few survivors and calls attention to the fact that conflict arises when superhumans separate themselves from humans. This convinces Superman to calm down and follow a new path.

McCay is later seen giving an inspiring sermon to his parish (now including Jim Corrigan, the human form of the Spectre), preaching a message of hope. Finally in the epilogue in the Planet Krypton restaurant, Corrigan expresses his chagrin that the meal named after him, "Spectre platter", is a mix of spinach and cottage cheese. McCay, who is with him, points out that at least he is remembered in some way. Batman is also there with Superman and Wonder Woman, and is amused of McCay's attempt of helping the Spirit of Vengeance reintegrate into society.

Other versions
The New-Earth version of Norman McKay appears in Justice Society of America Kingdom Come Special: Superman #1. The Superman of Earth-22 is worried that he is the cause of events that leads to the destruction of each world he inhabits. Remembering the Biblical warnings of the Earth-22 McKay just before the deadly events at the Gulag, he visits New-Earth's McKay in Chicago. This version of McKay is retired from preaching and his wife still alive.  McKay reassures Superman-22 that his presence on New-Earth may just as likely help prevent its destruction.

A man that looks strikingly similar to Norman McCay/Clark Ross appears in Alex Ross' Marvels issue 3, after Phil Sheldon exits J. Jonah Jameson's office towards the end of the issue.

References

DC Comics male characters
Fictional priests and priestesses
Comics characters introduced in 1996
Characters created by Alex Ross
Characters created by Mark Waid